"Message in a Bottle" is a song recorded by American singer-songwriter Taylor Swift. Released by Republic Records, it is the twenty-fifth track on Swift's second re-recorded album, Red (Taylor's Version) (2021). The song was written by Swift, Max Martin, and Shellback, the latter of whom also produced the song with Elvira Anderfjärd. It impacted US pop and adult pop radio stations as a single in November 2021.

"Message in a Bottle" is a 1980s-influenced dance-pop and electropop song with synthesizers and a pulsating bass. In reviews of Red (Taylor's Version), some critics praised the song's production and likened it to the sound of Swift's 2014 album, 1989, but a few others found the song underwhelming in comparison to other pop tracks on the album. The song reached the top 40 of charts in Australia and Canada. It peaked at number 45 on the Billboard Hot 100, and entered the top twenty of the Adult Top 40 and Mainstream Top 40 airplay charts.

Background and release
On August 5, 2021, Taylor Swift released a 30-second teaser on social media featuring jumbled letters that, when decoded, revealed the song titles and collaborators from the nine previously unreleased songs to be included on Red (Taylor's Version) (2021), her re-recorded version of her 2012 album Red. One of the nine tracks was "Message in a Bottle", announced shortly afterwards as the twenty-fifth song from the album. It was serviced to US radio as a single on November 12, 2021, coinciding with the album's release. Billboard reported that the track was being pushed on US radio stations as a single as soon as November 2021. A remix by Fat Max G was released to digital and streaming services on January 21, 2022.

Composition

"Message in a Bottle" is the only one of the nine "From the Vault" songs on Red (Taylor's Version) to have been co-written by Martin and Shellback, who worked with Swift on Red singles such as "We Are Never Ever Getting Back Together",  "I Knew You Were Trouble", and "22". It was the first song Swift wrote with them. Shellback and Elvira Anderfjärd jointly produced the song, with Shellback playing guitar on the track, while Anderfjärd performs on bass and drums. Both also contributed keyboards to the song. "Message in a Bottle" is set in the key of G major with a tempo of 116 beats per minute. It is a dance, dance-pop, and electropop song with synthesizers and a pulsating bass, with Swift's voice ranging between G3 and D5.

Critical reception
Music critics received "Message in a Bottle" with generally positive reviews. Writing for NME, Hannah Mylrea called the song a "effervescent nugget of pure-pop", saying it was "reminiscent of Carly Rae Jepsen's '80s-influenced record Emotion." Paul Bridgewater of The Line of Best Fit labeled the track "A-grade Swift", saying that it "would fit easily on Reds follow-up 1989". Clash also noted the "electronic soundscape and pulsing beat" as similar to 1989, writing that "Message in a Bottle" was a "Carly Rae Jepsen-esque offering" from Swift.

In iHeartRadio, Ariel King opined that "while the track maintains the theme of Red, where Swift worked through intense heartache, the upbeat instrumentals within the single just may be the song that bridged her into 1989." Ranking "Message in a Bottle" third among the nine Red (Taylor's Version) that were previously unreleased, Billboard writer Jason Lipshutz called the song a "compact, propulsive dance track that carries the same energy (and crackling charm) as the hits that pushed Swift’s sound toward mainstream pop leading into 2014's 1989".

Jonathan Keefe of Slant Magazine compared the track's hook to "We Are Never Ever Getting Back Together" and "Shake It Off", also noting that it did not have "the self-conscious repetitions of those hits". For Variety, Chris Willman gave the song a 4/5 rating, expressing surprise that the track was initially excluded from Red, calling it "a strong shot for hit single status" and "thoroughly infectious". However, Willman also stated that "as good as it is, you can imagine almost anyone in pop singing it", calling it "slightly impersonal in a way few of her released songs do".

Pitchforks Olivia Horn gave a lukewarm review, complimenting the glossy production but criticized the track for its "dearth of personality". Laura Snapes from The Guardian deemed "Message in a Bottle" generic and inferior compared to "22", another pop song that was included in the original 2012 album.

Commercial performance
With three days of tracking, "Message in a Bottle" debuted at number 36 on Billboards Adult Top 40 airplay chart dated November 20, 2021, marking Swift's thirty-sixth entry on that chart. It was the most requested song from Red (Taylor's Version) across iHeartRadio stations within the album's first release week. It peaked at number 11 on the Adult Top 40, 17 on the Mainstream Top 40, and 45 on the Billboard Hot 100. In Canada, "Message in a Bottle" was the most added song on pop radio for the week of November 27, 2021; it has since peaked at number 16.

Track listing
All tracks are noted as "Taylor's Version".Digital download and streaming "Message in a Bottle" (Fat Max G Remix) – 3:45
 "Message in a Bottle" (From the Vault) – 3:47Digital download and streaming "Message in a Bottle" (Fat Max G Remix) – 3:45
 "Message in a Bottle" (From the Vault) – 3:46
 "Message in a Bottle" (From the Vault)  – 3:46

Credits and personnel
Credits adapted from Red (Taylor's Version) album liner notes

 Taylor Swift – lead vocals, songwriting
 Shellback – songwriting, production, programming, keyboards, guitars
 Max Martin – songwriting
 Elvira Anderfjärd – production, programming, keyboards, drums, bass, backing vocals
 Randy Merrill – mastering
 Serban Ghenea – mixing
 John Hanes – engineering
 Christopher Rowe – vocal engineeringFat Max G Remix'

 Taylor Swift – lead vocals, songwriting
 Shellback – songwriting
 Max Martin – songwriting
 Fat Max Gsus – production, remixing, bass, drums, percussion, programming, synthesizer, vocal production
 Randy Merrill – masters engineering
 Serban Ghenea – mixing
 John Hanes – immersive mix engineering
 Christopher Rowe – vocal engineering

Charts

Weekly charts

Year-end charts

Release history

Notes

References

2021 songs
2021 singles
Taylor Swift songs
Songs about letters (message)
Songs written by Taylor Swift
Songs written by Max Martin
Songs written by Shellback (record producer)
Song recordings produced by Shellback (record producer)
Electropop songs